The 1908 Pembrokeshire by-election was held on 16 July 1908.  The by-election was held due to the elevation to the peerage of the incumbent Liberal MP, John Wynford Philipps.  It was won by the Liberal candidate Walter Roch.

Campaign
Roch had the support of the MPs W. Llewelyn Williams and W. Jones of the United Kingdom Alliance and the Free Trade League respectively. The Miners' Federation of Great Britain also strongly supported Roch.  Lort Williams, the Conservative candidate, was supported by emissaries from the Tariff Reform League and the National Trade Defence Association.

A formidable group of Suffragettes (including Emmeline Pankhurst) came to Pembrokeshire to campaign against Roch, not because they disliked him, or supported Lort-Williams, but because H.H. Asquith, the Liberal Prime Minister, was immovably opposed to the enfranchisement of women.

Result

References

Pembrokeshire by-election
Pembrokeshire by-election
1900s elections in Wales
20th century in Pembrokeshire
By-elections to the Parliament of the United Kingdom in Welsh constituencies
Elections in Pembrokeshire
Pembrokeshire by-election